A blintz is a rolled filled pancake of Ashkenazi Jewish origin, similar to a crepe or Russian blini.

History
Traditional blintzes are filled with sweetened cheese, sometimes with the addition of raisins. They are served on Shavuot.

Like the knishes, blintzes represent foods that are now considered typically Jewish, and exemplify the changes in foods that Jews adopted from their Christian neighbors.

References

See also
Israeli cuisine
Jewish cuisine

Shavuot
Jewish desserts
Hanukkah foods
Ashkenazi Jewish cuisine
Israeli cuisine